Isis District State High School, established in 1961, is located in the town of Childers, Queensland, set across two campuses on approximately . It is at a midpoint between the major centres of Bundaberg and  Maryborough. As well as providing an educational service for students exiting from Childers State School and St Joseph's Primary School, Isis High also services the adjoining communities of Biggenden, Booyal, Buxton, Cordalba, Dallarnil, Goodwood, Woodgate and Howard. It is the only high school in the town of Childers.

External links
Isis District State High School

Public high schools in Queensland
Schools in Wide Bay–Burnett
Educational institutions established in 1961
1961 establishments in Australia